The first tournament of second division of ACC Premier League was held in Singapore between 7–13 June 2014. Singapore won the tournament and qualified for 2016 ACC Premier League. Saudi Arabia finishing second qualified for 2015 ICC World Cricket League Division Six.

Points Table

Matches

.
 

 

 

 

 

 

 

 

 

 

 

 

 

 

Asian Cricket Council competitions
International cricket competitions in 2014
ACC Trophy
International cricket competitions in Singapore